Wai King, formerly Wai Do from 2007 to 2015, is one of the 29 constituencies in the Sai Kung District.

The constituency returns one district councillor to the Sai Kung District Council, with an election every four years.

Wai King constituency is loosely based on Ocean Shores in Tiu Keng Leng with estimated population of 14,598.

Councillors represented

Election results

2010s

References

Tiu Keng Leng
Constituencies of Hong Kong
Constituencies of Sai Kung District Council
2007 establishments in Hong Kong
Constituencies established in 2007